Josef Fuchs (born 24 July 1948) is a retired Swiss racing cyclist. As an amateur he won two world championship medals in 1969 and 1971, both on the road and on track. He also won a few minor races and two stages of the Tour de l'Avenir (1969 and 1971) and one of the Milk Race (1971).

In late 1971 he turned professional and the same year won the Giro della Toscana. He placed eighth overall in the 1975 Tour de France and won the Liège–Bastogne–Liège race in 1981.

During his career Fuchs won four national titles, two on track, as amateur in 1970 and 1971, and two
on the road, as professional in 1972 and 1973.

Major results

1966
 3rd Road race, National Junior Road Championships
1969
 1st Stage 10b Tour de l'Avenir
1970
 1st  Individual pursuit, National Amateur Track Championships
 1st Tour des Quatre-Cantons
1971
 1st  Individual pursuit, National Amateur Track Championships
 1st Giro del Mendrisiotto
 1st Stage 1 (ITT) Tour de l'Avenir
 2nd  Individual pursuit, UCI Amateur Track World Championships
 3rd Overall Milk Race
1st Stage 8
1972
 1st  Road race, National Road Championships
 1st Giro di Toscana
 1st Stage 1c (TTT) Cronostaffetta
 2nd Overall Tirreno–Adriatico
1st Stage 2
 6th GP Monaco
1973
 1st  Road race, National Road Championships
 1st Prologue (TTT) Tour de Suisse
1974
 1st Overall (TTT) Cronostaffetta
 4th Overall Tirreno–Adriatico
 7th Overall Vuelta a la Comunidad Valenciana
1st Prologue (TTT)
 7th Giro di Toscana
 7th Giro di Campania
 8th Trofeo Laigueglia
 9th Giro di Romagna
 10th Coppa Sabatini
1975
 2nd Overall Tour de Romandie
 4th Overall À travers Lausanne
 4th GP Lugano
 8th Overall Tour de France
 9th Züri-Metzgete
1976
 2nd Trofeo Masferrer
 4th Overall Critérium du Dauphiné Libéré
 4th Overall Setmana Catalana de Ciclisme
 4th Overall Vuelta a la Comunidad Valenciana
 8th Overall Vuelta a España
 9th Overall Volta a Catalunya
1977
 4th GP Alghero
 5th Overall Tirreno–Adriatico
 10th Züri-Metzgete
 10th Giro di Toscana
 10th Coppa Placci
1978
 3rd Overall Tour de Suisse
 3rd Overall Giro di Sardegna
 4th Overall Tirreno–Adriatico
1st Stage 3
 9th Tre Valli Varesine
1979
 1st Stage 3 Tirreno–Adriatico
 2nd GP Lugano
 4th Overall Tour de Suisse
1st Stage 5
 4th Overall Vuelta a Andalucía
 5th Overall Volta a Catalunya
1st Stage 4
 8th Overall Giro d'Italia
1980
 2nd Overall Tour de Suisse
1st Stage 8b (ITT)
 2nd Visp–Grachen
 3rd Trofeo Baracchi (with Daniel Gisiger)
 6th Gran Piemonte
 8th Overall Giro d'Italia
 8th Milano–Torino
 10th GP du canton d'Argovie
1981
 1st Liège–Bastogne–Liège
 1st GP Lugano
 2nd Overall Tour de Suisse
 5th Overall Giro d'Italia
 7th Overall Critérium International
 7th Overall Tour Méditerranéen
 10th Overall Tirreno–Adriatico

References

1948 births
Living people
Swiss male cyclists
Sportspeople from the canton of Schwyz
Tour de Suisse stage winners